is the first live DVD released by Korean boy group The Boss. It was released on June 6, 2012 on their Japanese label Sony Music Entertainment.

Information 
The DVD was the first live DVD by The Boss. The DVD features the live concert which was held at Shibuya Public Hall in Tokyo on March 20, 2012, and also includes rehearsal, backstage footage and private footage. The first press edition comes with a trading card randomly selected from six kinds.

Track listing 
 Opening
 Love Power
 Friends
 Girlfriend
 MC1
 Love song for you
 Back stage story vol.1
  
 
 
 Back stage story vol.2
 MC2
 
 
 Dearest
 MC3
 Love Bingo!
 Love Days
 Love Parade
 Magic
 Back stage story vol.3
 Jumping
 Love Story
 Ending
 Special Opening Movie

Charts

Release history

References

External links
 大国男児 | Sony Music 
 The Boss official website 
 

2012 video albums
The Boss (band) albums